The Bas Saharan Basin is an artesian aquifer system which covers most of the Algerian and Tunisian Sahara and extends to Libya, enclosing the whole of the Grand Erg Oriental.

References

Aquifers
Aquifers of Africa
Springs of Africa
Sahara
Springs of Algeria
Springs of Morocco
Springs of Libya
Springs of Tunisia
Springs of Western Sahara